Janjira State was a princely state in India during the British Raj. Its rulers were a Siddi dynasty of Habesha descent and the state was under the suzerainty of the Bombay Presidency.

Janjira State was located on the Konkan coast in the present-day Raigad district of Maharashtra. The state included the towns of Murud and Shrivardhan, as well as the fortified island of Murud-Janjira, just off the coastal village of Murud, which was the capital and the residence of the rulers. The state had an area of 839 km2, not counting Jafrabad, and a population of 110,389 inhabitants in 1931. Jafrabad, or Jafarabad state was a dependency of the Nawab of Janjira State located 320 km to the NNW.

History

Establishment 
According to one legend, in the year 1489 the Ahmadnagar Sultanate sent its Admiral Piram Khan (of Ethiopian descent) with orders to capture the Murud-Janjira castle from Ram Patil. Owing to the castle's fortifications, the Admiral could not attack conventionally.

He and his team disguised themselves as merchants and asked Ram Patil to safeguard their three hundred large boxes containing silks and wines from Surat. As thanks, Piram Khan threw a party with wine. Once Ram Patil and his soldiers were intoxicated, Piram Khan opened the boxes, which contained his soldiers, and used the opportunity to capture the castle and the island on which it stands.

In the century that followed the rulers put themselves under the overlordship of the Sultanate of Bijapur. During the seventeenth and eighteenth century Janjira successfully resisted the repeated attacks of the Maratha Empire.

Cooperation with the Ottomans 
According to Ottoman records, a combined force from the Ottomans and Janjira routed a Portuguese fleet in 1587 at Yemen. From this moment onwards Janjira played an important role in resisting Portuguese influence in the region.

There's further record of Cooperation with the Ottoman Empire when the Ottoman fleet first arrived in Aceh prior to Ottoman expedition to Aceh has included 200 Malabar sailors from Janjira State to aid the region Batak and the Maritime Southeast Asia in 1539.

Cooperation with the Mughals 
According to one records at one time Mughal emperor Aurangzeb supplied the Siddis of Janjira state with 2,000 men, provisions, ammunitions along with two Frigates and two large Man-of-war battleships. The ship arrived at Bombay harbor under the commands of Siddi Kasim and Siddi Sambal in 1677. The largest Mughal ship named Ganj-I-Sawai (Trading Ship) which was equipped with 800 guns and 400 musketeer type soldiers also stationed in the port of Surat.

Another record from East India Company factory which written 1673 has reported the Siddis fleet which wintered from Bombay has five Frigates and two Man-of-wars beside of fifteen grabs vessels. It is because the formidable naval warfare skills of Siddis in Janjira that Aurangzeb granting annual payment of 400.000 Rupee for the maintenance of their fleet.

Relations with the Marathas

Rivalry with the Marathas 
The main competitor of the Sidis was the Angrias, a Maratha family with sea forts and ships, based in southern Konkan.

Treaty with Marathas 
In 1733, Peshwa Bajirao of the Maratha Empire launched a campaign against the Siddis of Janjira. Bajirao's forces, however, did not take Janjira fort, though they captured much of the surrounding area; a favorable treaty gave the Marathas indirect control over virtually all of the Sidi's lands.

Post Maratha-rule 
When the British came to the Konkan area, the repeated attacks of the Marathas against Janjira ceased. Janjira State was administered as part of the Deccan States Agency of the Bombay Presidency, founded in 1799. In the nineteenth century the rulers maintained a military force of 123 men.

Following the independence of India in 1947, the state was merged with India.

Rulers
The royal family of Janjira were Sidis, also known as 'Habshi', assumed to be from Abyssinia. Initially the rulers of the state held the title of 'Wazir', but after 1803 the title of 'Nawab' was officially recognized by the British Raj. They were entitled to an 11 gun salute by the British authorities after the 1903 Coronation Durbar.

Wazirs of Janjira
                           Siddi Fattekhan
1676 - 1703                Kasim Yakut Khan II                (d. 1703)
1703 - 1707                Amabat Yaqut Khan II
1707 - 1732                Surur Yakut Khan II                (d. 1732) 
1732 - 1734                Hasan Khan (1st time)              (d. 1746)
1734 - 1737                Sumbul Khan
1737 - 1740                `Abd al-Rahman Khan
1740 - 1745                Hasan Khan (2nd time)              (s.a.)
1745 - 1757                Ibrahim Khan I (1st time)          (d. 1761)
1757                       Mohammad Khan I                    (d. 1757)
1757 - 1759                Ibrahim Khan I (2nd time)          (s.a.)

Thanadars of Jafarabad and Wazirs of Janjira
 
1759 - 1761                Ibrahim Khan I                     (s.a.)
1761 - 1772                Yaqut Khan (usurper to 6 Jun 1772) (d. 1772) 
1772 - 1784                `Abd al-Rahim Khan                 (d. 1784) 
1784 - 1789                Jauhar Khan                        (d. 1789)
 - in dispute with -
1784 - 1789                `Abd al-Karim Yaqut Khan
1789 - 1794                Ibrahim Khan II                    (d. 1826) 
1794 - 1803                Jumrud Khan                        (d. 1803)

Nawabs
 
1803 - 1826                Ibrahim Khan II                    (s.a.)
1826 - 31 Aug 1848         Mohammad Khan I                    (d. 1848)
31 Aug 1848 – 28 Jan 1879  Ibrahim Khan III                   (b. 1825 - d. 1879) 
28 Jan 1879 -  2 May 1922  Ahmad Khan                         (b. 1862 - d. 1922) (from 1 Jan 1895, Sir Ahmad Khan)
28 Jun 1879 – 11 Oct 1883  .... -Regent
 2 May 1922 – 15 Aug 1947  Mohammad Khan II                   (b. 1914 - d. 1972)
 2 May 1922 -  9 Nov 1933  Kulsum Begum (f) -Regent            (b. 1897 - d. 1959)

See also
Jafarabad State
Murud-Janjira
Sachin State
Gowalkot and Anjanvel
Political integration of India
Deccan States Agency

References

External links
  
Janjira State coat of arms
A Trip to Murud Janjira Fort

Koli princely states
Bombay Presidency
Siddhi people
Muslim princely states of India
Konkan
Raigad district
African diaspora
15th-century establishments in India
1489 establishments in Asia
1948 disestablishments in India
City-states